Michel Neves Dias (born 13 July 1980), or simply Michel, is a Brazilian footballer who plays as a striker.

Honours
Juventude
Copa do Brasil: 1999

Internacional
Copa Libertadores: 2006
FIFA Club World Cup: 2006

Vitória
Campeonato Baiano: 2008

External links

1980 births
Living people
Footballers from São Paulo
Brazilian footballers
Association football forwards
Campeonato Brasileiro Série A players
Campeonato Brasileiro Série B players
Esporte Clube Juventude players
Cruzeiro Esporte Clube players
Goiás Esporte Clube players
Sport Club Internacional players
Marília Atlético Clube players
Esporte Clube Vitória players
Ipatinga Futebol Clube players
Criciúma Esporte Clube players
Associação Portuguesa de Desportos players
K League 1 players
Jeonnam Dragons players
Primeira Liga players
C.D. Nacional players
Brazilian expatriate footballers
Expatriate footballers in South Korea
Brazilian expatriate sportspeople in South Korea
Expatriate footballers in Portugal
Brazilian expatriate sportspeople in Portugal